San Juan de Lopecancha is a district of Luya Province in Peru. One of its major points of interest are the ruins of Chachapoya.

San Juan de Lopecancha borders at the north with the Tingo District; at the East with Magdalena District, Chachapoyas and La Jalca District, Chachapoyas; at the South with the Santo Tomás District, Luya; and at the west with María District.

Districts of the Luya Province
Districts of the Amazonas Region